Quadrangularin A is an oligostilbene found in Cissus quadrangularis and in Parthenocissus laetevirens. It is a resveratrol dimer.

References 

Resveratrol oligomers
Stilbenoid dimers